Anyang County is a county in the north of Henan province, China. It is under the administration of Anyang city.

Administrative divisions
As 2012, this county is divided to 8 towns and 13 townships.
Towns

Townships

References

County-level divisions of Henan